Wannehain is a commune in the Nord department in northern France, on the border with Belgium.

The HSL 1 railway line to Brussels crosses the border at Wannehain.

Heraldry

Population

See also
Communes of the Nord department

References

Communes of Nord (French department)
French Flanders